Los Angeles County Museum may refer to:

 Natural History Museum of Los Angeles County
 Los Angeles County Museum of Art